TRIM62, also called DEAR1 (for ductal epithelium–associated RING chromosome 1), is a protein in the tripartite motif family. In human it is encoded by the gene TRIM62. TRIM62 is involved in the morphogenesis of the mammary gland, and loss of TRIM62 gene expression in breast is associated with a higher risk of recurrence in early-onset breast cancer.

References

Developmental genes and proteins